Michael Darren Young (born March 20, 1960) is a former professional baseball player. He played all or part of eight seasons in Major League Baseball, from 1982 to 1989, mostly as an outfielder and designated hitter. He played for the Baltimore Orioles for most of his major league career, but also played for the Philadelphia Phillies, Milwaukee Brewers, and Cleveland Indians. In 1990, he played in Japan for the Hiroshima Toyo Carp.

Young's best season was 1985, when he hit .273 with 28 home runs and 81 runs batted in for the Orioles. On May 28, 1987, Young became the fifth player in major league history to hit two extra-inning home runs in one game.  He homered in the 10th inning and hit a walk-off home run in the 12th inning to beat the California Angels, 8–7, at Baltimore's Memorial Stadium.

References

External links

Major League Baseball outfielders
Baltimore Orioles players
Philadelphia Phillies players
Milwaukee Brewers players
Cleveland Indians players
Hiroshima Toyo Carp players
Miami Orioles players
Rochester Red Wings players
Charlotte O's players
Colorado Springs Sky Sox players
Chabot Gladiators baseball players
American expatriate baseball players in Japan
Baseball players from California
Saint Mary's Gaels baseball players
African-American baseball players
1960 births
Living people